The Lincoln County Courthouse is a historic courthouse in Kemmerer, the county seat of Lincoln County, Wyoming, United States.  The courthouse's architecture is an unusual mixture of the Beaux-Arts and Classical Revival styles.  Built in 1925, it was designed by the Salt Lake City architectural company of Headlund & Watkins.  Located at the intersection of Sage Avenue and Garnet Street, the courthouse includes a high dome and classical façade, supported by large brick walls.

Functions
The courthouse remains functional today, housing the offices of the county commissioners and offices such as the county assessor, county clerk, and county treasurer.  Not all county offices use the courthouse; for example, the sheriff's office is located on a different street.

Recognition
Located adjacent to the courthouse is the Lincoln County War Memorial.  Dedicated on June 1, 1990, the memorial honors residents of Lincoln County who were killed in World War I, World War II, and the Korean and Vietnam Wars.

On November 8, 1984, the courthouse was added to the National Register of Historic Places.

See also
 National Register of Historic Places listings in Wyoming

References

External links
County website
Lincoln County Courthouse at the Wyoming State Historic Preservation Office

Government buildings completed in 1925
Beaux-Arts architecture in Wyoming
Neoclassical architecture in Wyoming
County courthouses in Wyoming
Buildings and structures in Lincoln County, Wyoming
Courthouses on the National Register of Historic Places in Wyoming
National Register of Historic Places in Lincoln County, Wyoming
Kemmerer, Wyoming